is a Japanese footballer currently playing as a forward for Hokkaido Consadole Sapporo.

Career statistics

Club
.

Notes

References

External links

1998 births
Living people
Japanese footballers
Japan youth international footballers
Meiji University alumni
Association football forwards
Hokkaido Consadole Sapporo players
J1 League players
Universiade medalists in football
Universiade gold medalists for Japan
Medalists at the 2019 Summer Universiade